The Rev. Robert Hall (2 May 1764 – 21 February 1831) was an English Baptist minister.

Life
He was born at Arnesby near Leicester, where his father Robert Hall was pastor of a Baptist congregation. Robert was the youngest of a family of fourteen. While still at the same school his passion for books absorbed most of his time, and in summer he used to go to the churchyard after school with a volume, and read till nightfall, making out the meaning of the more difficult words with the help of a pocket dictionary. From his sixth to his eleventh year he attended the school of Mr Simmons at Wigston, a village four miles from Arnesby. There he showed an intense interest in metaphysics; and before he was nine he had read and re-read Jonathan Edwards's Treatise on the Will and Butler's Analogy.

This incessant study at such an early period of life seems to have affected his health. After he left Mr Simmons's school his appearance was so sickly as to awaken fears of the presence of phthisis. He was sent to stay in the house of a gentleman near Kettering, who with an impropriety which Hall himself afterwards referred to as "egregious", prevailed upon the boy of eleven to give occasional addresses at prayer meetings. As his health seemed rapidly to recover, he was sent to a school at Northampton run by John Ryland, where he remained a year and a half, and "hath great progress in Latin and Greek". On leaving school he for some time studied divinity under the direction of his father and in October 1778 he entered the Bristol academy for the preparation of students for the Baptist ministry. Here his earlier confidence seems to have deserted him; when, in accordance with the arrangements of the academy, his turn came to deliver an address in the vestry of Broadmead chapel, be broke down on two separate occasions and was unable to finish.

On 13 August 1780, he was set apart to the ministry, but he still continued his studies at the academy; and in 1781, in accordance with the provisions of an exhibition which he held, he entered King's College, University of Aberdeen, where he took the degree of master of arts in March 1785. He had no rival in any of the classes, distinguishing himself alike in classics, philosophy and mathematics. He there formed the acquaintance of James Mackintosh, who, though a year younger, was a year his senior as a student. While they remained at Aberdeen the two were inseparable, reading together the best Greek authors, especially Plato, and discussing, either during their walks by the sea-shore and the banks of the Don or in their rooms until early morning, the most perplexed questions in philosophy and religion.

Between his last two sessions at Aberdeen, Hall acted as assistant pastor to Dr Evans at Broadmead chapel, Bristol, and three months after leaving the university he was appointed classical tutor in the Bristol academy, an office which he held for more than five years. Even at this period his extraordinary eloquence had excited an interest beyond the bounds of the denomination to which he belonged, and when he preached the chapel was generally crowded to excess, the audience including many intellectuals. As a result of suspicions in regard to his orthodoxy, he accepted an invitation to make trial of a congregation at St Andrew's Street Baptist Chapel Cambridge, of which he became pastor in July 1791. From the contents of a letter to the congregation which he left, it would appear that, while a firm believer in the proper divinity of Christ, he had at this time disowned the cardinal principles of Calvinism; and that he was so far a materialist as to "hold that man's thinking powers and faculties are the result of a certain organization of matter, and that after death he ceases to be conscious till the resurrection". It was during his Cambridge ministry, which extended over a period of fifteen years, that his oratory was most brilliant and most immediately powerful.

Hall began to suffer from mental derangement in November 1804. He recovered and was able to resume his duties in April 1805, but a recurrence forced him to resign his pastoral office in March 1806. On leaving Cambridge he paid a visit to his relatives in Leicestershire, and then for some time resided at Enderby preaching occasionally in some of the neighbouring villages.

Latterly he ministered to a small congregation in Harvey Lane, Leicester, and at the close of 1806 he accepted a call to be their stated pastor. In the autumn of 1807 he moved from Enderby to Leicester, and in 1808 he married the servant of a brother minister. He had proposed after an almost momentary acquaintance, allegedly in very abrupt and peculiar terms; it seems to have been a successful marriage.

On the death of Dr Ryland, Hall was invited to return to the pastorate of Broadmead chapel, Bristol, and as the peace of the congregation at Leicester had been to some degree disturbed by a controversy regarding several cases of discipline, he resolved to accept the invitation, and removed there in April 1826. He suffered badly from renal calculus, and increasing infirmities and sufferings afflicted him. Gradually the inability to take proper exercise led to a diseased condition of the heart, which resulted in his death. He is remembered as a great pulpit orator, of a somewhat laboured, rhetorical style in his written works, but of undeniable vigour in his spoken sermons.

Works
Hall's first published compositions had a political origin. In 1791 he wrote Christianity consistent with the Love of Freedom, a defense of the political conduct of dissenters against the attacks of John Clayton, gave expression to his hopes of political and social improvements as destined to result from the subversion of old ideas and institutions in the French Revolution. In 1793 he expounded his political sentiments in a longer pamphlet, Apology for the Freedom of the Press. He was unhappy with the pamphlet, and refused to permit publication after the third edition. In a new edition of 1821 he omitted the attack on Bishop Samuel Horsley, and stated that his political opinions had undergone no substantial change.

His other publications while at Cambridge were three sermons: On Modern Infidelity (1801), Reflections on War (1802) (sermon given at Cambridge on 1 June to celebrate the Treaty of Amiens), and Sentiments proper to the present Crisis (1803).
 
Hall's writings at Leicester embraced various tracts printed for private circulation; a number of contributions to the Eclectic Review, among which may be mentioned his articles on Foster's Essays and on Zeal without Innovation; several sermons, including those On the Advantages of Knowledge to the Lower Classes (1810), On the Death of the Princess Charlotte (1817), and On the Death of Dr Ryland (1825); and his pamphlet on Terms of Communion, in which he advocated intercommunion with all those who acknowledged the "essentials" of Christianity. In 1819 he published an edition in one volume of his sermons formerly printed.

Archives
Papers of Robert Hall are held at the Cadbury Research Library, University of Birmingham.

Notes

References
 Brackney, William H. A Genetic History of Baptist Thought: With Special Reference to Baptists in Britain and North America. Macon, GA: Mercer University Press, 2004.

External links
 

1764 births
1831 deaths
People from Arnesby
18th-century English Baptist ministers
Alumni of the University of Aberdeen
19th-century English Baptist ministers